Brandon West is a provincial electoral division in the Canadian province of Manitoba. It encompasses half of the City of Brandon, the other half being represented in Brandon East.

History of the riding
The original riding of Brandon West existed from 1886 to 1888, after the city and riding of Brandon was divided into two electoral divisions. It was eliminated in 1888, when the city became a single division again.

The modern riding of Brandon West was created in 1968, when the City of Brandon was again divided into two electoral districts. It was formally brought into being in the provincial election of 1969.

The riding is surrounded by Brandon East to the east and by Spruce Woods in all other directions. The City of Brandon itself is located in the southwestern region of the province.

The riding's population in 1996 was 19,808. In 1999, the average family income was $56,860, and the unemployment rate was 6.30%. The service sector accounts for 16% of industry in the riding, followed by health and social services at 15%.

Brandon West includes the more affluent section of Brandon, and has usually elected Progressive Conservative members. It was sometimes said that Brandon West voters elected Tories and Brandon East voters elected New Democrats to ensure that the city would have a member on the government side regardless of the provincial outcome.

Scott Smith of the New Democratic Party won the seat in 1999, and retained it with over 60% of the vote in 2003. He lost the seat in 2007 to Progressive Conservative candidate Rick Borotsik by just 56 votes.

List of provincial representatives

Electoral results

1886 general election

1969 general election

1973 general election

1977 general election

1981 general election

1986 general election

1988 general election

1990 general election

1995 general election

1999 general election

2003 general election

2007 general election

2011 general election

2016 general election

2019 general election

References

Manitoba provincial electoral districts
Politics of Brandon, Manitoba